The 2022 Kentucky Wildcats baseball team represents the University of Kentucky in the 2022 NCAA Division I baseball season. The Wildcats play their home games at Kentucky Proud Park.

Previous season

The Wildcats finished 29–23, 12–18 in the SEC to finish in sixth place in the East division. They were not invited to the postseason.

Schedule and results

Standings

Results

See also
2022 Kentucky Wildcats softball team

References

Kentucky
Kentucky Wildcats baseball seasons
Kentucky Wildcats baseball